Richard Eromoigbe (born 26 June 1984) is a Nigerian former football midfielder.

Career
In January 2002 Eromoigbe signed a contract with Bulgarian club Levski Sofia and joined Cherno More Varna in a year-long loan move, alongside his compatriot Emanuel Baba. He made his league debut in a 2–1 defeat at Spartak Pleven on 28 April. For the most part of his time at Cherno More, Eromoigbe was a substitute, making only eight A PFG appearances. In December 2002 he returned to Levski.

Eromoigbe made his Levski debut on 28 September 2003, in a 0–0 home draw against Cherno More. He became a regular fixture in the Blue team during the following 2004–05 campaign, partnering Daniel Borimirov in the centre of midfield and
playing a number of important matches. Eromoigbe started in Levski's 2005 Bulgarian Cup Final win over CSKA Sofia on 25 May 2005.

In the 2005–06 season, Eromoigbe helped Levski reach the quarter-finals of the UEFA Cup. On 9 September 2006, he scored his first goal at club level in an 8–0 win over Marek Dupnitsa.

He started the 2007/2008 season with Levski but on 26 February 2008 he was bought by the Russian FC Khimki. On 23 July 2008 Eromoigbe was on trial at Derby County, however Paul Jewell decided not to offer him a contract.

Eromoigbe was released by Khimki on 15 September 2009 and returned to Nigeria to play for Warri Wolves. In the transfer window of January 2011, he signed a contract with Cyprus club Anorthosis Famagusta F.C..

Eromoigbe was out of contract with Alki Larnaca when he was signed by Beroe manager Ilian Iliev on 5 January 2012.

Career statistics
Updated 5 January 2011.

Awards

Club
Levski Sofia

 Champion of Bulgaria: 2006, 2007
 Holder of Bulgarian Cup: 2005, 2007
 Bulgarian Supercup: 2005, 2007

International
Nigeria

 2008 Africa Cup of Nations: Quarter-finals

References

External links

 Profile at LevskiSofia.info

1984 births
Living people
Nigerian footballers
Association football midfielders
Nigeria international footballers
2008 Africa Cup of Nations players
PFC Cherno More Varna players
PFC Levski Sofia players
FC Khimki players
Warri Wolves F.C. players
Anorthosis Famagusta F.C. players
PFC Beroe Stara Zagora players
Nigerian expatriate footballers
Nigerian expatriate sportspeople in Bulgaria
Expatriate footballers in Bulgaria
Expatriate footballers in Russia
Expatriate footballers in Cyprus
First Professional Football League (Bulgaria) players
Russian Premier League players
Cypriot First Division players